Robert Brady (1931 – July 25, 2018) was a Canadian football player who played for the BC Lions and Toronto Argonauts. He played college football at the University of British Columbia. He died in 2018.

References

1930s births
2018 deaths
BC Lions players
Canadian football linebackers
Players of Canadian football from Ontario
Sportspeople from Sault Ste. Marie, Ontario
UBC Thunderbirds football players